The Portuguese Catholic Church, or Catholic Church in Portugal, is part of the worldwide Catholic Church in communion with the Pope in Rome, under the Portuguese Episcopal Conference. The Catholic Church is the world's largest Christian organisation. It is Portugal's largest religion and its former state religion, and has existed in the territory since the Iberian Peninsula was ruled by the Roman Empire.

There are an estimated nine million baptised Catholics in Portugal (84% of the population) in twenty dioceses, served by 2789 priests. Although a large number wish to be baptized, married in the church, and receive last rites, only 19% of the national population attend Mass and take the sacraments regularly.

In 2010, the average age of priests was 62. In 2012 88% of the Portuguese population considered themselves Catholic in a commissioned survey of religious attitudes sponsored by a Christian organization.

History
Western Christianity was introduced to Lusitania, what is now Portugal under the Roman Empire in the first half of the first millennium AD. The present-day Portuguese state was founded in 1139 by King Afonso Henriques during the Reconquista, in which the Christian kingdoms of the northern Iberian Peninsula reconquered the South from the Cordoba Caliphate of the Sunni Muslim Moors. Crusaders from other Catholic realms aided the reconquest, which Portugal finished in 1249 with the conquest of Algarve.

After the Fall of Constantinople to the Sunni Caliphate of Ottoman Turks, Portuguese discoveries in the Age of Exploration, would lead to the establishment of the Portuguese Empire from the early 15th century onwards, spreading Catholicism to Portuguese colonies in Ceuta on the Barbary coast of North Africa, Sub-Saharan Africa, the East Indies in Asia, and South America. The Lusophone countries of Angola, Brazil, Cape Verde, Mozambique, São Tomé and Príncipe, and Timor-Leste all have Catholic majorities as a result. The Primate of the East Indies  based in the Portuguese Goa of early-modern India was part of the Portuguese Empire in the East, and a significant Latin Christian minority remains in the Indian subcontinent, the most prominent of which are Goan Catholics. Bombay East Indian Christians, Mangalorean Christians& Latin Christians of Malabar are also among the lesser-known New Christian converts in the Eastern hemisphere.

In 1910, the Portuguese Republic abolished the policy of having the Latin Church as the state religion, in favour of secularism. However, the right-wing Salazar regime from 1932 to 1974 re-established Catholicism as the state religion, which had repercussions such as the Annexation of Goa and Damaon, after which the system was subsequently disestablished along with the regime.

Sexual abuse
In 2021 the Portuguese Catholic Bishops' Conference established an independent committee for the investigation of any sexual abuse of minors within the Portuguese church, the Independent Commission for the Study of Sexual Abuse of Children in the Catholic Church in Portugal began its work in January of 2022 and issued its final report in February 2023. The commission was led by child psychologist Pedro Strecht who headed a 'multidisciplinary and gender-balanced' investigative panel which sought participation from members of the public who had experienced abuse in institutions run by the Church, such as parishes, schools, orphanages or hospitals, or who had otherwise been abused at the hands of a minister or employee of the Church. The Commission received 564 testimonies, of which it held 512 to be verified, relating to incidents of abuse which occurred between 1950 and the Commission's establishment in 2021. From these testimonies the Commission identified that around 77% of alleged perpetrators were priests with 57% of victims as males, most of whom being aged between 10 to 14. Commission president Strecht extrapolated that the figure of victims likely stood at around 5000 individuals and further proposed that as many 100 priests in active ministry as of February 2023 had been credibly accused of abuse, he stated that the commission would submit the names of these priests to the Church and public prosecutor in due course. Following the report's publication 25 serving priests have been reported to the office of public prosecutions.

President of the Portuguese Catholic Bishops' Conference Josè Ornelas responded to the report's publication with words of apology and confirmed the Portuguese bishops' intention to implement the report's recommendations.

Organization
Within Portugal, the hierarchy consists of archbishops and bishops.  At the top of the hierarchy is the archbishop who is known as the Patriarch of Lisbon. The remainder of the dioceses of Portugal, each headed by a bishop, includes:

Lisbon (with the dignity of Patriarchate)
Angra
Funchal
Guarda
Leiria-Fátima
Portalegre-Castelo Branco
Santarém
Setúbal
Braga
Aveiro
Bragança-Miranda
Coimbra
Lamego
Porto
Viana do Castelo
Vila Real
Viseu
Évora
Beja
Faro

Sites

Portugal is also the location of one of the major Catholic shrines and Marian pilgrimage sites, in the world famous city of Fátima, honoring Our Lady of Fátima.

The northern city of Braga is an important Catholic center. A Portuguese saying which lists characteristics of different cities states that "Braga prays". Besides the Cathedral of Braga, it also has the Sanctuary of Bom Jesus do Monte and the Sanctuary of Our Lady of Sameiro.

One of the routes on the Way of St. James, a major Catholic pilgrimage to the Santiago de Compostela Cathedral in Galicia, Spain, is the Portuguese route, starting from Lisbon Cathedral and spanning 610 km. Among those who have taken it was Queen Elizabeth of Portugal, who was canonized, in the 14th century.

Portuguese Popes
Two popes have been born in what is now Portugal, although only the latter was ever a subject of a country by that name. Damasus I was born in what is now Portugal in 306, and his reign as pope from 366 to 384 saw the Scriptures translated to Latin. He is now a saint, with his feast celebrated on December 11.

Pedro Julião, born in Lisbon around 1215, led the church as Pope John XXI from 1276 to 1277.

Gallery

See also
Catholic University of Portugal
Dissolution of the monasteries in Portugal
Ecclesiastical history of Braga
List of cathedrals in Portugal
Portuguese Inquisition
Religion in Portugal

References

 
Portugal
Portugal
Portuguese culture